Antinephele lunulata is a moth of the family Sphingidae. It was described by Rothschild and Jordan in 1903, and is known from forests and wooded habitats from Sierra Leone to Cameroon, the Democratic Republic of the Congo, Zambia, Zimbabwe and Tanzania, as well as Madagascar.

Subspecies
Antinephele lunulata lunulata
Antinephele lunulata turlini - Darge, 1972 (Madagascar)

References

External links
African moths: Images & distribution map

Antinephele
Lepidoptera of Cameroon
Lepidoptera of the Democratic Republic of the Congo
Lepidoptera of Gabon
Lepidoptera of Tanzania
Lepidoptera of West Africa
Lepidoptera of Zambia
Lepidoptera of Zimbabwe
Moths of Madagascar
Moths of Sub-Saharan Africa
Moths described in 1903